Narayanas Arihant Ocean Tower is an 18-storied residential building in Chennai, India. Located on Wallajah Road, off the arterial Anna Salai, the building has 80 housing units with a total built-up area of 140,000 sq ft. It is the tallest residential building located in downtown Chennai.

History
The building was constructed on the land where Paragon Talkies, one of the oldest cinema theatres in the city, formerly stood. This theatre was owned by Presidency Talkies Private Limited.

See also

 List of tallest buildings in Chennai

References

Residential highrises in Chennai